The lake minnow or swamp minnow (Rhynchocypris percnurus) is a Eurasian species of small freshwater cyprinid fish. It has a wide but disjunct distribution including parts of Europe (Belarus, Czech Republic, Germany, Lithuania, Poland, Russia, and Ukraine) and Asia (northern China, Japan, Korea, and Siberia).

Individuals in this species can grow up to 18.5 cm. This species also reproduces sexually.

References

Rhynchocypris
Freshwater fish of Europe
Freshwater fish of China
Freshwater fish of Japan
Fish of Central Asia
Fish of Korea
Fish of Mongolia
Fish of Russia
Fauna of Siberia
Fish described in 1814
Taxa named by Peter Simon Pallas
Taxonomy articles created by Polbot